Marcel Thiry (13 March 1897 – 5 September 1977) was a French-speaking Belgian poet. During World War I, he and his brother Oscar served in the Belgian Expeditionary Corps in Russia.

He was awarded the Prix Valery Larbaud in 1976 for Toi qui pâlis au nom de Vancouver, a book of poems reminiscent of Blaise Cendrars and Guillaume Apollinaire. He is the father of virologist Lise Thiry.

Main works

Poetry 
 Le cœur et les sens (1919)
 Toi qui pâlis au nom de Vancouver (1924), Prix Valery Larbaud
 Plongeantes Proues (1925)
 L'Enfant prodigue (1927)
 Statue de la fatigue Prix triennal de poésie 1934
 Marchands (1936)
 La Mer de la Tranquillité (1938)
 Âges (1950)
 Usine à penser des choses tristes (1957)
 Vie-Poésie (1961)
 Le Festin d'attente (1963)
 Le Jardin fixe (1969)
 Saison cinq et quatre proses (1969)
 L'Ego des neiges (1972)
 Songes et spélonques (1973)
 L'Encore (1975)

Novels and short stories 
 Échec au temps (1945)
 Juste ou la Quête d'Hélène (1953)
 Comme si (1959)
 Nouvelles du Grand Possible (1960)
 Simul et autres cas (1963)
 Nondum jam non (1966)

Essays 
 Voir grand (1921), essai politique
 Hitler n'est pas jeune (1940), pamphlet
 Lettre aux jeunes Wallons (1960), essai politique
 Le Poème et la langue (1967), essai littéraire

References
 France, Peter (Ed.) (1995). The New Oxford Companion to Literature in French. Oxford: Clarendon Press.  .

External links
 Marcel Thiry on wallonie-en-ligne.net

Belgian poets in French
1897 births
1977 deaths
Walloon movement activists
Belgian military personnel of World War I
Writers from Charleroi
20th-century Belgian poets
Belgian male poets
Prix Valery Larbaud winners
20th-century Belgian male writers